Hitra is a municipality in Trøndelag county, Norway. The municipality covers the island of Hitra and hundreds smaller islands, islets, and skerries. It is part of the Fosen region. The administrative centre of the municipality is the village of Fillan. Other villages include Andersskogan, Ansnes, Forsnes, Hestvika, Knarrlagsund, Kvenvær, Melandsjøen, Nordbotn, Sandstad, and Ulvan.

The  municipality is the 149th largest by area out of the 356 municipalities in Norway. Hitra is the 179th most populous municipality in Norway with a population of 5,156.

Hitra is famous in Norway for its large and dense population of Red Deer (as symbolised in its coat of arms — see image right). Hitra is a member of the International Island Games Association.

General information

The prestegjeld of Hitra was established as a municipality on 1 January 1838 (see formannskapsdistrikt law). On 1 January 1877, the northern island district of Frøya (population: 3,949) was separated from Hitra to form a municipality of its own. On 1 January 1886, the southern and eastern parts of Hitra were separated into a new municipality of Fillan. This left Hitra with 2,241 residents. Then on 1 January 1913, the western part of Hitra was separated to form the new municipality of Kvenvær. This left Hitra with 1,439 residents. During the 1960s, there were many municipal mergers across Norway due to the work of the Schei Committee. On 1 January 1964, the municipalities of Hitra, Kvenvær, Fillan, and Sandstad were merged to form a new, larger Hitra municipality. Prior to the merger, Hitra had 1,344 residents.

On 1 January 2018, the municipality switched from the old Sør-Trøndelag county to the new Trøndelag county.

On 1 January 2020, the island of Hemnskjela and the northwestern corner of the mainland municipality of Snillfjord was merged into Hitra.

Name
The municipality (originally the parish) is named after the island of Hitra. The name is probably derived from a word meaning "split" or "cleft" (referring to the many inlets of the island). Until 1918, the name of the island and municipality was spelled Hitteren.

Coat of arms
The coat of arms was granted on 7 August 1987. The official blazon is "Azure, a stag's head couped argent". This means the arms have a blue field (background) and the charge is the head of a stag. The stag's head has a tincture of argent which means it is commonly colored white, but if it is made out of metal, then silver is used. The blue color in the field symbolizes the importance of the sea for the island municipality. The design of the stag's head symbolizes that Hitra is home to one of Northern Europe's largest populations of red deer. The arms were based on an idea by Ketil Gylland from Fillan and drawn by the designer Einar Skjervold from Trondheim.

Churches
The Church of Norway has two parishes within the municipality of Hitra. It is part of the Orkdal prosti (deanery) in the Diocese of Nidaros.

Government
All municipalities in Norway, including Hitra, are responsible for primary education (through 10th grade), outpatient health services, senior citizen services, unemployment and other social services, zoning, economic development, and municipal roads. The municipality is governed by a municipal council of elected representatives, which in turn elect a mayor.  The municipality falls under the Trøndelag District Court and the Frostating Court of Appeal.

Municipal council
The municipal council of Hitra is made up of 23 representatives that are elected to four year terms. The party breakdown of the council is as follows:

Mayors
The mayors of Hitra (incomplete list):

1920–1922: Fredrik H. Strøm (Bp)
1923–1925: Morten Lossius (V)
1926–1931: Fredrik H. Strøm (Bp)
1932–1934: Johan Olaus Asmundvaag (H)
1935–1940: Ludvig Smaage (V)
1941–1942: Morten Lossius (NS)
1942–1945: Sigbjørn Årnes (NS)
1945-1945: Ludvig Smaage (V)
1946–1947: Sten Hamnes (Ap)
1948–1955: Ludvig Smaage (V)
1956–1959: Peder Roksvåg (Ap)
1960–1963: Jakob Storvik (LL)
1964–1967: Arne Schanche Nilsen (Sp)
1968–1971: Isak Hegerberg (H)
1972–1975: Arne Schanche Nilsen (Sp)
1976–1981: Isak Hegerberg (H)
1982–1983: Bergljot Stokkan (Sp)
1984–1987: Helge Jektvik (Ap)
1988–1999: Egil Hestnes (H)
1999–2003: Sigmund Jessen (Ap)
2003–2007: Egil Hestnes (H)
2007–present: Ole Haugen (Ap)

Geography

Hitra is the seventh largest island of mainland Norway. It is bordered by the municipality of Frøya to the north and the mainland municipalities of Hemne and Snillfjord to the south. It lies between the Trondheimsleia strait and the Frøyfjorden.

Other than the large island of Hitra, there are many other islands in the municipality, notably Fjellværsøya, Ulvøya, Dolmøya, Helgbustadøya, and Bispøyan. The Børøyholmen Lighthouse and Terningen Lighthouse are located in the Trondheimsleia in the southeast part of Hitra municipality.

Transportation

The company Kystekspressen runs westamaran services from Trondheim and Kristiansund.

Energy

Notable people 

 Simon Michelet (1863–1942) a Norwegian theologian, teacher and academic; brought up in Hitra
 John Aalmo (1902–1981) a Norwegian politician, Mayor of Sandstad 1934 to 1957
 Martin Skaaren (1905 in Hitra – 1999) a Norwegian politician, Mayor of Kvenvær municipality 1945 to 1961
 Kjerstin Øvrelid (1929 in Hitra – 1989) a Norwegian painter of flowers and the sea and skerries
 Knut Børø (born 1948 in Hitra) a retired 5,000 and 10,000 metres runner; competed in the 1972 and 1976 Summer Olympics
 Rita Ottervik (born 1966 in Hitra) a Norwegian politician, Mayor of Trondheim since 2003
 Anders Jektvik (born 1982 in Hitra) a Norwegian musician, singer, songwriter and guitarist
 Margaret Berger (born 1985) a Norwegian singer, songwriter, music director and DJ; brought up in Hitra

See also
 Hitra official football team

References

External links

Hitra Windpark 
Municipal fact sheet from Statistics Norway 

 
Municipalities of Trøndelag
1838 establishments in Norway